The Vampire Who Admires Me is a 2008 Hong Kong mystery comedy film directed by Cub Chin starring Samuel Pang and Roger Kwok and actresses JJ Jia Maggie Li, Natalie Meng, model Ankie Beilke, Winnie Leung, and model Tanya Ng.

Cast

External links 
 
 The Vampire Who Admires Me at the Hong Kong Movie Database
 The Vampire Who Admires Me at the Hong Kong Cinemagic
 CityLine
 LoveHKFilm

2008 horror films
2000s comedy horror films
2008 films
Hong Kong horror films
2008 comedy films
2000s Hong Kong films